Sir Robert Alexander Falla  (21 July 1901 – 23 February 1979) was a New Zealand museum administrator and ornithologist.

Early life
Falla was born in Palmerston North in 1901 to George Falla and his wife, Elizabeth Kirk. As his father was working for the railways, the family shifted frequently, and he lived in Hawera, Masterton, and Invercargill. At his primary school in Invercargill, he developed an interest in natural history due to the influence of Alfred Philpott. Falla gained a junior national scholarship and studied at Auckland Grammar School, from where he graduated in 1918. He pursued his dream of going to sea for a few years in various jobs, but then started to follow his interest in ornithology, first through part-time study at Auckland University College, and then at Auckland Training College, a training institution for  teachers. He transferred to the university in Auckland, from where he graduated in 1924 with a Bachelor of Arts, in after some teaching at primary schools, with a Master of Arts in 1927.

Professional career
He was assistant zoologist with the British, Australian and New Zealand Antarctic Research Expedition (BANZARE) under Sir Douglas Mawson 1929–1931.  He was the founding president of the Ornithological Society of New Zealand.  He was involved in the organisation of the wartime subantarctic Cape Expedition coastwatching program of 1941–1945.

He held positions in various New Zealand museums including director of Canterbury Museum from 1 March 1937 to 1947, and director of the Dominion Museum, Wellington, from 1947 until 1966. He was a member of the Royal Australasian Ornithologists Union (RAOU), president 1951–1952, and made a fellow of the Royal Australasian Ornithologists Union in 1973.

He described Pycroft's petrel (Pterodroma pycrofti ). Falla's skink (Oligosoma fallai) is named for him, as is the Ornithological Society of New Zealand's Robert Falla Memorial Award.

In 1953, Falla was awarded the Queen Elizabeth II Coronation Medal. In the 1959 Queen's Birthday Honours, he was appointed a Companion of the Order of St Michael and St George, in recognition of his services as director of the Dominion Museum. In the 1973 New Year Honours, Falla was appointed a Knight Commander of the Order of the British Empire, for services to conservation.

Family and death
On 18 May 1928, Falla married Elayne Mary Burton, known as Molly, at Te Aroha; they were to have two daughters and one son. His wife died in May 1978. Falla was found dead at his home in the Lower Hutt suburb of Eastbourne on 24 February 1979.

References

External links

Bright sparcs biography
Video of Dr Falla at Kapiti Island: New Zealand National Film Unit presents Pictorial Parade No. 102 (1960) via Archives New Zealand min 3.33 onward

1901 births
1979 deaths
New Zealand ornithologists
Explorers of Antarctica
Directors of Canterbury Museum, Christchurch
People associated with the Museum of New Zealand Te Papa Tongarewa
People from Palmerston North
Presidents of the Royal Society of New Zealand
20th-century New Zealand zoologists
People educated at Auckland Grammar School
University of Auckland alumni
New Zealand Antarctic scientists
20th-century New Zealand scientists
20th-century explorers
New Zealand Companions of the Order of St Michael and St George
New Zealand Knights Commander of the Order of the British Empire
Museum administrators